Kim Do-yeon ( or  ; born 7 December 1988) is a South Korean footballer who plays for Hyundai Steel Red Angels. With South Korea, she participated at the 2015 FIFA Women's World Cup.

References

External links

1988 births
Living people
South Korean women's footballers
Women's association football defenders
South Korea women's under-17 international footballers
South Korea women's under-20 international footballers
South Korea women's international footballers
2015 FIFA Women's World Cup players
WK League players
Asian Games medalists in football
Footballers at the 2010 Asian Games
Footballers at the 2014 Asian Games
Asian Games bronze medalists for South Korea
Medalists at the 2010 Asian Games
Medalists at the 2014 Asian Games
Incheon Hyundai Steel Red Angels WFC players
Universiade gold medalists for South Korea
Universiade medalists in football
2019 FIFA Women's World Cup players
Medalists at the 2009 Summer Universiade
21st-century South Korean women